Fleury-les-Aubrais is a commune in the Loiret department, Centre-Val de Loire, France. It is a northern suburb of Orléans.

As a part of German-occupied France, its railway station was destroyed in 1944 by the Combined Bomber Offensive.

Population

See also
 Communes of the Loiret department

References

External links

 Official website 

Fleurylesaubrais